Pontine  may refer to:

 Having to do with the pons, a structure located in the brain stem (from pons, "bridge")
 Pontine Marshes, a region of Italy near Rome
 Pontine Islands, islands of Italy near Circeo

See also